The Xi'an Incident is a 1981 Chinese historical drama film directed by Cheng Yin, starring Jin Ange, Wang Tiecheng and Sun Feihu. It was produced by the Xi’an Film Studio and seeks to be a historically accurate representation of the 1936 Xi'an Incident.

The film was critically acclaimed and won three awards at the 2nd Golden Rooster Awards: Best Director, Best Supporting Actor (Sun Feihu for his portrayal of Chiang Kai-shek) and Best Make-up.

Plot
Marshal Zhang Xueliang, Commander of the North Eastern Army, grows progressively disillusioned by Kuomintang leader Chiang Kai-shek's policy to engage the Communist Party of China rather than fight the Japanese invaders which are occupying Manchuria. Despite numerous pleas, Chiang does not budge. After discussing with fellow general Yang Hucheng, the two take events into their own hands and place Chiang Kai-shek under arrest on December 12, 1936, forcing Chiang into a coalition with the CPC.

Cast
Jin Ange - Zhang Xueliang
Wang Tiecheng - Zhou Enlai
Sun Feihu - Chiang Kai-shek
Xin Jing - Yang Hucheng
Gu Yue - Mao Zedong

Box office
In terms of box office admissions, it was among the highest-grossing films in China, with  tickets sold by 1985.

External links

References

 https://projects.zo.uni-heidelberg.de/representations/xian/backgroundxian.htm Accessed on August 12, 2017

1981 films
1980s Mandarin-language films
Chinese historical films
Chinese war films
Second Sino-Japanese War films
1980s historical films
Films set in the 1930s
Films set in China
Films shot in China
Cultural depictions of Chiang Kai-shek
Cultural depictions of Mao Zedong
Cultural depictions of Zhou Enlai
1980s war films